Heerde is a municipality and a town in the eastern Netherlands. Compared to the rest of the Netherlands, Heerde is fairly religious, as are many of the towns and cities in the Veluwe region.

Population centres

Politics 
The municipal council consists of 17 seats, which have been divided as follows since 2018:
 CU-SGP - 4 seats
 CDA - 4 seats
 Municipal Interest Farmers Party Heerde - 3 seats 
 VVD - 2 seats
 D66-GL - 2 seats
 PvdA - 2 seats

Sport 
The municipality has five amateur soccer clubs: vv Heerde, SEH, WZC Wapenveld, vv Wapenveld and Vevo.

Topography 

Dutch Topographic map of the municipality of Heerde, June 2015.

Notable residents 

 Daniël de Clercq (1854 in Heerde – 1931) a Dutch socialist and activist
 Hendrik Jan van Duren (1937 in Heerde – 2008) a Dutch politician. 
 Marijke Abels (born 1948 in Deventer) a Dutch visual artist, one of her sculptures is at the roundabout of the A50 junction in Heerde

Sport 
 Jaap Zielhuis (born 1966 in Heerde) a Dutch sailor, competed at the 2004 Summer Olympics 
 Jacco Eltingh (born 1970 in Heerde) a former professional male tennis player
 Gerard van Velde (born 1971 in Wapenveld) a Dutch retired speed skating sprinter, gold medallist in the 2002 Winter Olympics

Gallery

References

External links

Official website

 
Municipalities of Gelderland
Populated places in Gelderland